The Promise is the third album by British pop group T'Pau. It was released in 1991.

Overview
The album reached #10 on the UK Albums Chart and gave the group two charting singles - "Whenever You Need Me" (a UK Top 20) and "Walk on Air". A third single, a remix of the track "Soul Destruction", failed to make the chart and a fourth single, "Only a Heartbeat", was released only in the United States and Japan. The group disbanded shortly after the release of this album and its singles.

Following on from the cover art for the band's previous albums, the artwork for the release included the word promise rearranged to form a face. Unlike Bridge of Spies and Rage, this face was less predominantly placed.

Track listing 
"Soul Destruction" – 3:46
"Whenever You Need Me" – 4:06
"Walk on Air" – 4:35
"Made of Money" – 3:50
"Hold On to Love" – 4:18
"Strange Place" – 4:30
"One Direction" – 4:00
"Only a Heartbeat" – 4:40
"The Promise" – 3:59
"A Place in My Heart" – 3:59
"Man and Woman" – 4:38
"Purity" – 3:48

Chart performance

References

External links

1991 albums
T'Pau (band) albums